Patrick McGovern may refer to:

 Patrick Aloysius Alphonsus McGovern (1872–1951), former Bishop of Cheyenne
 Patrick Joseph McGovern (1937–2014), American businessman, founder of International Data Group
 Patrick McGovern (Irish politician) (1875–1949), Irish Centre Party/Fine Gael politician
 Patrick Edward McGovern (born 1944), biomolecular archaeologist, University of Pennsylvania Museum
 Patrick Terence McGovern (1920–1984), Irish Catholic priest and unofficial member of the Legislative Council of Hong Kong